The National University of Malaysia (abbreviated as UKM) is a public university located in Bandar Baru Bangi, Hulu Langat District, Selangor, Malaysia. Its teaching hospital, Universiti Kebangsaan Malaysia Medical Centre (UKMMC) is located in Cheras and also has a branch campus in Kuala Lumpur.

There are 17,500 undergraduate students enrolled, and 5,105 postgraduate students of which 1,368 are foreign students from 35 countries.

History

Universiti Kebangsaan Malaysia was born from the aspirations of the nationalists to uphold the Malay language as a language of knowledge. The quest for a national university was suggested in 1923 by the writer Abdul Kadir Adabi as a move against British colonisation. This nationalist tide galvanised Malay intellectuals of the time but met British suppression. The nationalists never wavered and in 1969 the movement again blossomed. A Sponsoring Committee chaired by Syed Nasir Ismail, a Malay intellectual, was set up to prepare a report recommending the establishment of UKM. Other prominent members of this committee include Dr. Mahathir Mohamed (Tun), Malaysia's fourth Prime Minister who was then the Education Minister, and Dr. Mohd Rashdan Haji Baba, who later became UKM's first Vice-Chancellor.

Universiti Kebangsaan Malaysia opened its doors on 18 May 1970 to 192 undergraduate students in Jalan Pantai Baru, Kuala Lumpur, a temporary campus housing three main faculties, the Faculties of Science, Arts and Islamic Studies. In October 1977, UKM moved to its present premises which form the main campus in Bangi.

UKM has two health campuses, the Kuala Lumpur campus in Jalan Raja Muda Abdul Aziz, and the UKM Medical Centre in Cheras. The Kuala Lumpur campus consists of the Faculties of Health Sciences, Pharmacy, Dentistry and the Pre-Clinical Departments of the Medical Faculty.

The campus in Cheras consists of the Medical Faculty, the UKM Teaching Hospital (Hospital Canselor Tuanku Muhriz UKM (HCTM) ) and the UKM Medical Molecular Biology Institute (UMBI) . The Cheras campus was opened in 1997. Besides these campuses, UKM operates seven research stations (RS) ; The Tasik Chini RS, The Marine Ecosystem RS, The Langkawi Geopark RS, The Marine RS, The Fraser's Hill RS, The Plant Biotechnology RS and in the main campus itself, the UKM Campus Living Laboratory, which comprises the UKM Permanent Forest Reserve, or its Malay name, Hutan Simpan Kekal UKM as well as the Fernarium and the Herbarium.

Based on a foundation of 30 years of research, UKM was awarded the status of a Malaysian Research University in October 2006 by the Ministry of Higher Education, a move designed to propel the four public universities into leading research universities in line with the Higher Education Strategic Plan 2007–2020.

The year 2006 also saw UKM winning the Prime Minister's Quality Award.

List of Vice-chancellors
The list of vice-chancellors of Universiti Kebangsaan Malaysia.

Coat of arms 

The coat of arms of the National University of Malaysia is depicted as a quartered shield featuring an atomic symbol, a compass, a gear, and the national flower – a hibiscus rosa-sinensis, with an overlaid book placed on top of it. It is blazoned:

Shield: Tierced per pall reversed, the dexter Or an Atomic symbol Sable, the sinister Azure a Compass and a Gear all Proper, the base Argent a hibiscus rosa-sinensis flower Proper; and a Chief Gules a Tiger passant to the sinister Proper.

Crest: An overlaid open book Argent fimbriated Sable.

Academics

Faculties
Founding faculties (est. 1970):
Social Science and Humanities (established as the Faculty of Arts)
Science and Technology (established as the Faculty of Sciences)
Islamic Studies
Later faculties:
Medicine (KL Campus at Jalan Raja Muda Abdul Aziz, Kuala Lumpur and HUKM) 
Health Sciences (KL Campus at Jalan Raja Muda Abdul Aziz) 
Dentistry (KL Campus at Jalan Raja Muda Abdul Aziz) 
Economics and Management
Education
Engineering and Built Environment
Information Science and Technology
Pharmacy (KL Campus at Jalan Raja Muda Abdul Aziz) 
Law
Graduate School of Business

Service Centre
Chancellory Office
Department of Registrar
Department of Bursary
Department of Development & Maintenance
Centre for Corporate Communications
Centre for Quality Assurance
Centre for Research & Instrumentation Management
Centre for Collaborative Innovation
Centre for Teaching & Learning Technologies
Centre for Information Technology
Centre for Kesatria
International Relations Centre (UKM Global) 
Centre of Risk Management, Sustainability & Occupational Health (ROSH) 
Graduate Centre
Strategy-UKM
Students and Alumni Affairs
Sport Centre
UKM Library
UKM Press
UKM Islamic Centre
UKM Medical Centre
UKM Children's Specialist Hospital
PERMATApintar™ National Gifted Center
Office of the Legal Advisor and Integrity

Institutes
Fuel Cell Institute (SELFUEL) 
Institute for Environment & Development (LESTARI) 
Institute for Malaysian & International Studies (IKMAS) 
Institute of Ethnic Studies (KITA) 
Institute of Microengineering & Nanoelectronics (IMEN) 
Institute of Climate Change (IPI) 
Institute of Systems Biology (INBIOSIS) 
Institute of the Malay World & Civilization (ATMA) 
Institute of Visual Informatics (IVI) 
Institute of Islam Hadhari (HADHARI) 
UKM Medical Molecular Biology Institute (UMBI) 
Solar Energy Research Institute (SERI) 
Institute of Ear, Hearing & Speech (I-HEARS)

Residential Colleges
Kolej Aminuddin Baki (KAB) 
Kolej Burhanudin Helmy (KBH) 
Kolej Dato' Onn (KDO) 
Kolej Ibrahim Yaakub (KIY) 
Kolej Ibu Zain (KIZ) 
Kolej Keris Mas (KKM) 
Kolej Pendeta Zaba (KPZ) 
Kolej Rahim Kajai (KRK) 
Kolej Tun Dr. Ismail (KTDI) 
Kolej Tun Hussein Onn (KTHO) 
Kolej Tun Syed Nasir (KTSN) 
Kolej Ungku Omar (KUO)

Notable alumni

Anwar Ibrahim, 10th Prime Minister of Malaysia
Mohd Rashid Hasnon, Deputy Speaker of the House of Representatives, former Deputy Chief Minister I of Penang
Sheikh Muszaphar Shukor, Malaysia's first astronaut
Syed Hussein Alatas, Malaysian academician, sociologist and politician
Anthony Loke Siew Fook, former Minister of Transport of Malaysia
Liow Tiong Lai, former Minister of Transport of Malaysia
Dr. Jemilah Mahmood, Chief of the Humanitarian Response Branch, United Nations Populations Fund (UNFPA) in New York
Anwar Fazal, Father of Malaysian NGO Movement – Honorary Doctorate in Law, 1997
Razali Ibrahim, former Deputy Minister in the Prime Minister's Department
Ramlan Bin Ibrahim, diplomat, Permanent Representative of Malaysia to the United Nations
Ayman Rashdan Wong, writer
Jess Lee, singer
Mohamad Fuzi Harun, 11th Inspector-General of Royal Malaysian Police
Nenney Shushaidah Binti Shamsuddin, one of the two female Syariah High Court Judges in Malaysia
Abdul Hamid Bador, 12th Inspector-General of Royal Malaysian Police
Mohd Zuki Ali, 15th Chief Secretary to the Government of Malaysia

Rankings

When the Times Higher Education Guide University Rankings (THE) was published in October 2014, it was reported that UKM, along with Universiti Malaya, opted to not submit data for consideration. UKM Strategic Centre deputy executive director Associate Professor Dr Masturah Markom responded to the snub by saying that the rankings were unfair to the Malaysian educational context. She specifically cited the measurement of "industry income" in the THE methodology of university assessment, stating that Malaysian industry input cannot compete with other countries such as the United States of America. This is despite the fact that only a 2.5% weightage is allocated to "industry income" in the methodology, with more conventional categories such as teaching and research still making up 90%.

See also
UKM Medical Centre
UKM Medical Molecular Biology Institute (UMBI) 
PATMA Library

References

External links

Official website
Official news portal

 
Universities and colleges in Selangor
Educational institutions established in 1970
ASEAN University Network
Business schools in Malaysia
Law schools in Malaysia
Engineering universities and colleges in Malaysia
Information technology schools in Malaysia
Medical schools in Malaysia
Nursing schools in Malaysia
1970 establishments in Malaysia